Frederick Luther Fowke (May 27, 1857 – August 25, 1939) was a merchant and political figure in Ontario, Canada. He represented Ontario South in the House of Commons of Canada from 1908 to 1911 as a Liberal.

He was born in Harmony, East Whitby, Canada West, the son of Job Wilson Fowke and Adeline Perkins Stone, the daughter of Marshall B. Stone, a Minnesota senator. Fowke operated a general store and sold grain and coal. He served as mayor of Oshawa from 1898 to 1907; his term was briefly interrupted by Robert McLaughlin who served during the year 1899. Fowke served as MP for Ontario South from 1908 to 1911, however he was defeated when he ran for reelection to the House of Commons in 1911 by William Smith. He served as a commissioner in charge of restoration following the Halifax Explosion. Fowke was also a member of the Toronto Board of Trade and owned Gladstone Villa in Oshawa.

He is buried in Oshawa's Union Cemetery.

References
Toop, Elizabeth.  "The sport of politics : some political campaigns in earlier days".  The York pioneer (v. 103 : 2008), p. 3-15.

Members of the House of Commons of Canada from Ontario
Liberal Party of Canada MPs
Mayors of Oshawa
1857 births
1939 deaths